As a Man Thinks is a 1919 American silent drama film directed by George Irving and starring Leah Baird, Henry Clive and Warburton Gamble. It is adapted from the 1911 Broadway play As a Man Thinks by Augustus Thomas.

Cast
 Leah Baird as Elinor Clayton
 Henry Clive as Frank Clayton
 Warburton Gamble as Benjamin De Lota
 Charles Brandt as Dr. Seelig 
 Betty Howe as 	Vedah Seelig
 A.J. Herbert as Burrell 
 Elaine Amazar as  Mimi Chardenet
 Joseph W. Smiley as Mr. Hoover 
 Jane Jennings as Mrs. Hoover
 Baby Ivy Ward as Dick Clayton

References

Bibliography
 Goble, Alan. The Complete Index to Literary Sources in Film. Walter de Gruyter, 1999.

External links
 

1919 films
1919 drama films
1910s English-language films
American silent feature films
Silent American drama films
American black-and-white films
Films directed by George Irving
Films distributed by W. W. Hodkinson Corporation
Pathé Exchange films
Films set in Paris
1910s American films